The 2012 Major League Baseball All-Star Game was the 83rd edition of the Major League Baseball All-Star Game. It was held on July 10, 2012, during the 2012 Major League Baseball season at Kauffman Stadium in Kansas City, Missouri, home of the Kansas City Royals. This marked the third time the Mid-summer Classic had been played in Kansas City, with Kauffman Stadium (then named Royals Stadium) last hosting the event in 1973, the stadium's first year of existence. The event was also held at Municipal Stadium in 1960, when the Athletics were still based there, one of two played that season. The game was televised in the United States by Fox.

The National League shut out the American League for the sixth time in All-Star Game history. It was the third-largest margin of victory for any Mid-summer Classic. The TV ratings fell even further than the 2011 edition, earning a 6.8 rating and 12 share on Fox. The total number of viewers who watched any portion of the game was up 7 percent from the previous year, however, with 27.7 million total viewers.

As of 2022, this is the last time the National League won the All-Star Game.

Host selection
Kauffman Stadium underwent a US $250 million renovation, funded by a 0.375% sales tax increase on the residents of Jackson County, Missouri for the Harry S. Truman Sports Complex, which also houses Arrowhead Stadium, the home of the Kansas City Chiefs. The referendum passed in an election on April 4, 2006. As a result of the deal, Major League Baseball commissioner Bud Selig promised the area that the team would host a future All-Star Game no later than 2014. On June 16, 2010, Selig officially awarded the rights to host the game to Kansas City for the 2012 season.

Fenway Park was also in contention for hosting the 2012 All-Star Game to celebrate that park's centennial. However Boston had most recently hosted the 1999 All-Star game.

Fan balloting

Starters
Balloting for the 2012 All-Star Game starters began online April 20 and continued through June 28. Fan voting also took place in each MLB stadium, beginning May 8 (at the latest) and ended on June 22. The top vote-getters at each position (including the designated hitter for the American League) and the top three among outfielders, were named the starters for their respective leagues. The results were announced on July 1.  A record 40.2 million votes were cast, beating out the previous record from 2011 (32.5 million) by a little under eight million. Josh Hamilton was the leading vote-getter with 11,073,744 votes, shattering the record that José Bautista set the prior year with 7,454,753 votes. Buster Posey set a new NL record for votes this year with 7,621,370 votes.

Final roster spot
After the rosters were revealed, a second ballot of five players per league was created for the All-Star Final Vote to determine the 34th and final player of each roster. The online balloting was conducted from Sunday afternoon, July 1, through Thursday afternoon, July 5.  The winners of the All-Star Final Vote were Yu Darvish of the Texas Rangers (AL) and David Freese of the St. Louis Cardinals (NL).  Chipper Jones, of the Atlanta Braves, was removed from the ballot on July 3 after he replaced Matt Kemp on the roster due to injury.

Rosters
Players in italics have since been inducted into the National Baseball Hall of Fame.

American League

National League

The only position player able to participate who was not used was Adam Dunn. Lance Lynn and Huston Street were the pitchers not used by the National League. For the American League, pitchers Yu Darvish, Félix Hernández (who threw 114 pitches on July 8), Jake Peavy, and Chris Perez did not enter the game.

Game summary

In the first inning, the National League scored five runs off of Justin Verlander. Melky Cabrera singled with one out, then scored on Ryan Braun's double. Two two-out walks loaded the bases before Pablo Sandoval cleared them with a triple to the right field corner. Sandoval then scored on Dan Uggla's single. In the fourth, Rafael Furcal tripled with two outs off of Matt Harrison and scored on Matt Holliday's single. Melky Cabrera's home run then capped the game's scoring. The AL had the bases loaded in the fifth off of Clayton Kershaw, but failed to drive in any runs and the NL won 8–0. It was the third straight season the AL lost in an All-Star game. With two hits and two RBI, Melky Cabrera was named the All-Star Game MVP and was the first Giants player to be named All-Star MVP since Bobby Bonds in the 1973 All-Star Game, which was also held in Kansas City.

Starters

Box score

Umpires: Home Plate – Gerry Davis (crew chief); First Base – Jim Joyce; Second Base – Brian Runge; Third Base – Tony Randazzo; Left Field – Lance Barksdale; Right Field – Brian Knight 
Weather: Temperature: , clear; Wind: 11 mph, in from left field 
Time of Game: 2:59 
Attendance: 40,933

Notes
Though he retired after the 2011 season, Tony La Russa managed the National League All-Stars, becoming only the second retired manager to manage an All-Star Game after John McGraw did it in 1933. With his win, La Russa became the first manager to win an All-Star Game in both leagues.
Bryce Harper's selection to the All-Star Game at age 19 made him the third-youngest player ever to be named an All-Star, behind Dwight Gooden and Bob Feller, and the youngest ever position player.
Gerry Davis umpired his fourth All-Star Game, second behind the plate. The other time Davis called balls and strikes was the 2002 tie game.
The National League recorded a five-run inning for the fourth time, in the opening frame for the first time; 1954 (4th inning), 1969 (3rd inning), 2003 (5th inning).  The A.L. has previously had three bigger innings in All-Star Game history.
Pablo Sandoval highlighted the National League's big first inning with the first bases-loaded triple in the history of the Mid-summer Classic. It was the first of the senior circuit's All-Star Game record three triples in the game – the others coming in the fourth inning from Rafael Furcal and Ryan Braun, who became the first All-Star teammates to each triple in the same half-inning.
Players from the eventual World Series champion San Francisco Giants (Sandoval, Melky Cabrera and Buster Posey)—who would therefore reap the benefits of the NL's win by gaining home-field advantage in the World Series—either scored and/or drove in seven of the eight runs, while teammate Matt Cain was the winning pitcher; conversely, the five first-inning runs were scored off Justin Verlander, whose Detroit Tigers would be their World Series opponent.
Fox, the broadcasting network of the game in the United States, preempted the live broadcasts of "O Canada" and "The Star-Spangled Banner" (performed by Luke Bryan) for commercials. Kellie Pickler sang "God Bless America" during the 7th-inning stretch.
This game was the last time the Houston Astros were represented as a team from the National League. The team moved to the American League West in 2013.
Sixty-one players (32 N.L. and 29 A.L.) took part in the game, surpassing the nine-inning record of 60 set in 2011. This was the first time there was a shutout since the American League was shut out in the 1996 Major League Baseball All-Star Game.

See also

List of Major League Baseball All-Star Game winners
All-Star Futures Game
Home Run Derby

References

External links

Official website of the All-Star Game
2012 Major League Baseball All-Star Game at Baseball Reference
2012 Major League Baseball All-Star Game at ESPN

Major League Baseball All-Star Game
All-Star
2010s in Kansas City, Missouri
Major League Baseball All Star Game
July 2012 sports events in the United States
Baseball competitions in Kansas City, Missouri